John MacKenna (born 1952 in Castledermot, Co Kildare) is an Irish playwright and novelist.

MacKenna taught for a number of years before working as a producer at RTÉ Radio in 1980.  Between then and 2002, when he left the station to spend more time writing, and acting with Meeting Lane Theatre Company, he worked in a number of areas - including music, education, current affairs, documentaries, features and religion - as a senior producer and commissioning editor.

MacKenna produced several memorable radio series, including work on the Amish people of Pennsylvania; the Shaker Community of Sabbath Day Lake; a ground-breaking series called Someone Has To Do It and the highly regarded Secret Gardens of the Heart, which followed a young woman through the last months of her life.  His radio documentary series on Leonard Cohen, How The Heart Approaches What It Yearns, won him a Jacob's Award.

He is the author of several novels, Clare, The Last Fine Summer, A Haunted Heart, The Space Between Us and Joseph; four collections of short stories, The Fallen, A Year of Our Lives, The River Field' and 'Once We Sang Like Other Men; three volumes of poetry and a biography of Ernest Shackleton; his memoir, Things You Should Know (October 2006) and his story cycle titled The River Field (autumn 2007, both published by New Island Books) won considerable critical acclaim.'MacKenna writes for, directs and acts with Mend and Makedo Theatre Co and among his works for that company are Breathless (2005 & 2010 - Directed by Petra Costigan-Oorthuijs and Richard Ball ); My Father's Life (2006); We Once Sang Like Other Men (2009); Redemption Song (2011 Both directed by Marian Brophy). His theatrical work, Who by Fire, for the Water to Wine Theatre Company is based on the experiences of a Holocaust survivor, and uses Leonard Cohen's songs the mood for a chilling exposition of the continuing threat of totalitarianism. It has toured Ireland to great popular acclaim.

His radio play The Woman at the Window - based on the life of the Quaker writer Mary Leadbeater - was broadcast by RTÉ Radio and won a silver medal at the Worldplay Radio Festival in New York in 2007.

In 2008 his play Corner Boys (Directed by Marian Brophy) toured the country and The River Field was published by New Island Books.

His novel The Space Between Us was published in 2009 by New Island Books.

His poetry collection Where Sadness Begins was published by Salmon Books in 2012

His novel, Clare, based on the life of the English poet John Clare was republished in May 2014 in the New Island Modern Irish Classics series, to coincide with the 150th anniversary of the poet's death.

In 2014 he was short-listed for the position of Irish Fiction Laureate and in the same year his novel Joseph was published by New Island Books.

In 2015 his poetry collection By the Light of Four Moons was published by Doire Press. Also in 2015, his play Lucinda Sly was staged Mend & Makedo Theatre Co and toured nationally.

In 2016, his adaptation of Ernest Shackleton's South was published by RealReads.

In 2017 New Island Books published his short-story collection Once We Sang Like Other Men.
In the same year his collaborative requiem, with Leonard Cohen, Between Your Love and Mine was premiered and toured nationally, as well as being staged at Áras an Uactaráin.
His collaborative play "Jerusalem Tomorrow" (with Angela Keogh) toured in 2018.

His one-man play, The Mental, directed by Angela Keogh and written and performed by MacKenna was premiered and toured in the autumn of 2018 and spring 2019.

In the autumn of 2019 the requiem Between Your Love and Mine was staged at the National Concert Hall in Dublin and at a number of theatres around the country.

Among the awards his works have won are the Hennessy Literary Award, the Irish Times Fiction Award and the C Day-Lewis Award. He also teaches a number of courses in media studies and creative writing at the NUIM Maynooth and Kilkenny.

In October 2020. 'I Knew This Place - a collection of more than eighty of his essay contributions to the RTE series Sunday Miscellany was published by The Harvest Press.

In late 2021, New Island Books published  We Seldom Talk About the Past - MacKenna's Selected Short Stories - and The Harvest Press released a double CD of MacKenna reading twenty-eight radio essays from I Knew This Place''.

References

External links
 John MacKenna at Irish Writers Online

1952 births
Living people
Irish novelists
Irish dramatists and playwrights
Irish male dramatists and playwrights
Irish male novelists
Jacob's Award winners